Guarello Island (Spanish: Isla Guarello) is an island in Madre de Dios Archipelago in Magallanes Region. Guarello Island is in a limestone area that also includes Madre de Dios Island. The island has the world's southernmost limestone mine and it has reserves for 100 years, and 600,000 tons of limestone with a millesimal fineness of 96% of Calcium carbonate are extracted each year. Half of the production is used in the steel mills of Huachipato which also owns the mines.

See also
 List of islands of Chile

External links
 Islands of Chile @ United Nations Environment Programme
 World island information @ WorldIslandInfo.com
 South America Island High Points above 1000 meters
 United States Hydrographic Office, South America Pilot (1916)

Islands of Magallanes Region
Calcium carbonate mining